Stephen J. Stonley (29 September 1889 – September 1967) was an English professional footballer who played in the Football League for Woolwich Arsenal as a centre forward. He also played in the Southern League for Northampton Town and Brentford.

Personal life 
Stonley served as a gunner with the Royal Garrison Artillery and later worked at the Royal Arsenal during the First World War.

Career statistics

References

1889 births
1967 deaths
Footballers from Sunderland
English footballers
Association football forwards
Northampton Town F.C. players
Newcastle City F.C. players
Arsenal F.C. players
Brentford F.C. players
Southern Football League players
English Football League players
British Army personnel of World War I
Royal Garrison Artillery soldiers
Military personnel from County Durham

External links